Dobrič is a settlement in the Municipality of Polzela in Slovenia. It lies in the Ložnica Hills north of Polzela and south of Velenje. The area is part of the traditional region of Styria. The municipality is now included in the Savinja Statistical Region.

Mount Oljka

Church

The local church, built on top of Mount Oljka west of the settlement, is dedicated to the Holy Cross and belongs to the parish of Polzela. It was built between 1754 and 1757 and has a triple nave with a double belfry.

References

External links

Dobrič on Geopedia

Populated places in the Municipality of Polzela